The right margin of the oesophagus is continuous with the lesser curvature of the stomach, while the left margin joins the greater curvature at an acute angle, termed the cardiac notch (or cardial notch).

See also
 Cardiac notch of left lung

References

External links
 

Digestive system
Stomach